NGC 4144 is a barred spiral galaxy in the constellation Ursa Major. It was discovered by William Herschel on April 10, 1788.

Gallery

References

External links
 

Ursa Major (constellation)
Astronomical objects discovered in 1788
Barred spiral galaxies
Discoveries by William Herschel
4144
038688